Nestos Chrysoupoli Football Club is a Greek football club based in Chrysoupoli, Kavala, Greece.

History
The group was founded in 1930 and reached the peak of its subheadings in the 1970s when it took part in the championship of the Second National League.

Specifically, 1973 was champion of Eps Kavalas  and then won the promotion through the special championship Hellenic Football Federation. So, he played two consecutive years (even unique in history) to B Ethniki. 1973–74 season ranked 11th in Gamma Ethniki and in 1974–75 came 14th and relegated at the local league.

During the next decade they participated in Gamma Ethniki, and had multiple instances in Delta Ethniki.

Specifically, in 1986 was champion of Delta Ethniki and promoted to Gamma Ethniki.

He was 14th in 1986–87 season and 18th (last) in 1987–88 season, and so relegated. Returned, without luck, for the last time in this category, 1993–94 (18th).

Players

Current squad

Honours

Domestic
 Third Division: 1
 1972–73
 Fourth Division: 2
 1985–86, 1992–93
 Greek Football Amateur Cup: 1
 2014–15
 Amateurs' Super Cup Greece: 1
 2014–15
 Eps Kavala Champions: 3
 1972–73, 2012–13, 2014–15

External links
 http://nestosfc.blogspot.gr/

Football clubs in Eastern Macedonia and Thrace
Kavala (regional unit)
Gamma Ethniki clubs